Lucy Jane Dixon (born 9 August 1989) is an English actress, best known for her roles as Danielle Harker in the BBC One school-based drama series Waterloo Road and Tilly Evans in the Channel 4 soap opera Hollyoaks.

Early life 
Dixon is from Gee Cross, Hyde and described in an Manchester Evening News interview how she loved acting from the earliest age. She recalled how a role in her school nativity as “shepherd number one” had been what sparked her love for the stage.

Filmography

Awards and nominations

References

External links 
 

Living people
English television actresses
English soap opera actresses
1989 births
People from Hyde, Greater Manchester
21st-century English actresses